To Beep or Not to Beep is a Merrie Melodies animated short starring Wile E. Coyote and the Road Runner. Released on December 28, 1963, the cartoon was written by Chuck Jones and John Dunn, and directed by Jones (Maurice Noble and Tom Ray receive credit as co-directors). This is the penultimate Road Runner/Coyote short that Chuck Jones directed at Warner Bros. during the original "classic" era. This is also the final Warner Bros. cartoon released in 1963.

The title is a play on the famous line in William Shakespeare's play Hamlet. This installment of the Coyote-Road Runner series marked the first time that no Latin-esque terms are used to indicate who each character is.

Almost all of the footage was originally made as part of a 1962 television pilot named Adventures of the Road Runner. The pilot was rejected by ABC, and several gags from the short were rearranged into this cartoon in a cost-cutting measure (a similar practice was used in the Three Stooges two-reelers of the mid-to-late 1950s). A whole new soundtrack was crafted by musician Bill Lava and editor Treg Brown.

Plot
Introduction: The opening scene shows Wile E. Coyote reading a "Western Cookery" recipe book in total peace. Completely unaware that his prey has zoomed up behind him to sneak a peek at his book, he slurps at the prospect of a road-runner banquet featuring "Road Runner Surprise," and gets answered by another slurp. Turning to find himself nose-to-beak with the Road Runner, the Coyote gives himself a real headache responding to a startling "BEEP-BEEP!" from point-blank range.

1. The Coyote places a lasso in the road, and pulls back as soon as he hears his opponent, but he soon realizes that (1) he missed, and (2) there is no room on the cliff behind him to step back. He falls toward the ground, and the end of the lasso latches onto a loose rock on another outcropping as he passes it. Thinking the rock will be heavy enough to support him and prevent the impact, Wile E. ties his end of the lasso around his waist, but doesn't realize that the rope is too long before hitting the ground at full force. Still dazed by his miscalculation and the resulting impact, the Coyote pulls on the lasso and dislodges the rock, which drops on himself, leaving his form coiled up as he walks away.

2. Later on, as the usual chase takes place, the Road Runner goes supersonic and rockets away, causing several cacti to uproot due to his speed. They continue to follow the Road Runner across the landscape, and Wile E. continues chasing until he sees that a bridge has retracted due to the bird's trajectory. Wile E. falls through the ravine, followed by one of the slower cacti that did not make it past the bridge, causing him to leap yelling in pain all the way up to the top of the ravine like a rocket.

3. Not having learned from previous uses of this device, the Coyote attaches a spring to a loose rock and tries to shoot himself toward the Road Runner, but instead the rock is thrown backwards and it continues to pull the Coyote back like a Newton's cradle until the rock hurtles over the edge of a cliff.  Wile E. manages to grab onto the brink and stay put, until the rock flies back the way it came, taking out the entire outcropping and throwing the Coyote across the desert. The two rocks finally detach themselves, but this leads to the broken outcropping forming a see-saw, with Wile E. lying on one end and the big rock landing on the other side. This catapults the Coyote even further, until he falls through a narrow canyon with the rock directly on top, leading to the spring retracting and Wile E. being trapped directly underneath. By loosening the harness, the Coyote escapes and sighs with relief, having escaped with only a fall to the ground.

4. Lying in wait for the Road Runner inside a crane, the Coyote pulls up a wrecking ball to drop on the Road Runner when he passes this segment. However, he pulls it up too far, and the wrecking ball rolls onto the top of the crane and smashes the cockpit.

5. The final segment features six attempts to flatten the Road Runner with a boulder hurled by a catapult. Unfortunately for Wile E., the catapult finds multiple ways to malfunction, resulting in the Coyote getting pancaked each time.

Attempt 1: Wile E. stands behind the catapult. The boulder simply falls on the Coyote when it is released, due to its weight being too much for the catapult to handle.

Attempt 2: Wile E. stands in front of the catapult and (predictably) gets smashed due to his location.

Attempt 3: Having learned from the first two, Wile E. stands well out of the way of the catapult, out of range, to make the first attempt's failure impossible.  However, the catapult flips itself over and squashes its user.

Attempt 4: The Coyote stands to the side and releases the boulder, which is punched up into the air, and unfortunately falls in the wrong direction - toward the Coyote instead of the Road Runner.

Attempt 5: Having been smashed every time in some way or another, Wile E. hides underneath the catapult itself when he releases the string, however, the entire catapult comes apart, crushing Wile E. in the bottom.

Attempt 6: This time, Wile E. hides inside a manhole while he releases the string.  However, the catapult jams and the arm does not throw the boulder.  The Coyote tries to fix the problem by prodding the catapult's body first, then shaking it violently (and immediately diving back into his manhole after each attempt to avoid injury), but nothing happens.  Getting very impatient, Wile E. lodges himself between the arm and the body and stands up, then climbs up the arm on stomps on it, again to no avail.  Sliding down to the rock itself, he tries to pry it free from the arm.  Suddenly, the catapult finally unjams, something that the Coyote initially fails to notice (as he is still trying to pry the rock free) until he sees a large rock formation ahead of him.  Coyote is flattened as his rock flies through the formation, having taken a slice of that with it then falling off.   A network of power lines captures the Coyote and slings him all the way back to the top of the catapult's arm, which plops him on the ground to be smashed once and for all by the boulder.

After that final disaster, the audience discovers the reason for the catapult's "artificial intelligence." The camera zooms in towards the manufacturer's nameplate and reveals that the catapult had been built, not by ACME, but by the "Road-Runner Manufacturing Company — Phoenix * Taos * Santa Fe * Flagstaff." The Road Runner on the nameplate then comes to life, gives the audience a "Beep-Beep" and then zooms off.

Crew
Co-Directors: Maurice Noble & Tom Ray
Story: John Dunn & Chuck Jones
Animation: Richard Thompson, Bob Bransford, Tom Ray & Ken Harris
Design: Maurice Noble
Layouts: Maurice Noble & Ernie Nordli
Backgrounds: Philip DeGuard
Effects Animation: Harry Love
Film Editor: Treg Brown & Joe Flaherty
Voice Characterizations: Mel Blanc & Paul Julian
Music: Bill Lava
Produced by David H. DePatie
Directed by Chuck Jones

References

External links
 

1963 animated films
1963 short films
1960s Warner Bros. animated short films
Merrie Melodies short films
American animated short films
Short films directed by Chuck Jones
Wile E. Coyote and the Road Runner films
Films scored by William Lava
Films about Canis
Animated films about birds
Films directed by Maurice Noble
Animated films about mammals
Animated films without speech